Vladimir Ivanov (born 6 February 1973) is a former Bulgarian footballer who played as a defender. He is also known as "Fugata".  On 3 November 2016, following the departure of Aleksandr Tarkhanov, Ivanov was appointed as permanent manager. However, following a streak of poor results, on 11 May 2017 he was demoted to assistant of the newly appointed manager Zlatomir Zagorčić.

In his playing career Ivanov played for Slavia Sofia, Levski Sofia, Lokomotiv Sofia, Lokomotiv Plovdiv and German Borussia Mönchengladbach.

He was part of the Bulgarian 2004 European Football Championship team, who exited in the first round, finishing bottom of Group C, having finished top of Qualifying Group 8 in the pre-tournament phase.

Managerial statistics

References

External links
 
 Profile at LevskiSofia.info

1973 births
Living people
Bulgarian footballers
UEFA Euro 2004 players
Association football defenders
PFC Slavia Sofia players
PFC Levski Sofia players
Borussia Mönchengladbach players
FC Lokomotiv 1929 Sofia players
PFC Lokomotiv Plovdiv players
PFC Slavia Sofia managers
Bulgaria international footballers
First Professional Football League (Bulgaria) players
Bulgarian expatriate footballers
Expatriate footballers in Germany
Bulgarian football managers
Footballers from Sofia